The River Lavant is a winterbourne that rises at East Dean and flows west to Singleton, then south past West Dean and Lavant to Chichester. From east of Chichester its natural course was south to the sea at Pagham, but the Romans diverted it to flow around the southern walls of Chichester and then west into Chichester Harbour.

History

The Lavant may once have had its source north of Midhurst, with the increased drainage area possibly leading to size more akin to the River Rother; however, erosion and weathering over centuries have led to its current source and size.

The Lavant's course has changed on multiple occasions, one significant instance being in Roman times when the river was believed to have been diverted through Chichester to provide drinking water for the town.

The Lavant is believed to have made its way to the sea via Pagham Rife and Pagham Harbour. Newbury notes historians have conjectured this diversion may have taken place in either Roman or medieval times, one side effect being less stress on drainage to lands to the north of Pagham.

Floods

The Lavant has been responsible for multiple flooding events throughout recent centuries, with the St Pancras area of Chichester being most typically affected. Floods were recorded in 1713, 1763, 1771, 1797, 1809, 1826, 1938 and 1960. 

In January 1994 heavy rainfall caused the River Lavant to burst its banks, causing extensive flooding in Chichester and surrounding villagesthe worst for 130 yearsand forcing the closure of the A27 and A259 roads. Military "Green Goddess" fire engines were stationed in the city for several weeks pumping out groundwater through miles of pipes. When exceptionally high rainfall in the autumn of 2000 threatened renewed flooding of Chichester a project was led by the Environment Agency, using emergency powers to build a relief channel to divert excess water back into the natural route of Pagham Rife. This brought forward work planned for 2001, compressing it into two weeks, and was completed days before the anticipated flood surge in the River Lavant occurred. The emergency work was subsequently made into a permanent relief channel, with sluices at Westhampnett.

Course

The river continues east to Singleton, then curves southwards remaining a little to the east of the A286 road past West Dean and Mid-Lavant and through to East Lavant. The Lavant continues through farmland towards the former site of Westhampnett Mill, passing Summersdale and Graylingwell to the west and Goodwood airfield and racing circuit to the east. Near to site of the former mill, which is now the top end of The Barn retail park, the Lavant bifurcates, the eastern distributary taking a clockwise course to come in on the north side of the A285, the western distributary heading to join the other where Church Road meets Westhampnett Road. The meeting is now immediately after culverts constructed under Abel Smith Way, completed  2020.

The Lavant continues westwards towards Chichester, crossing to the south side of the A285 at St. James Road before proceeding beside it to the  Green Lane footbridge. Thereafter it runs between the A285 and A286 before it enters a long culvert starting from about middle of the A286 one way system at Hornet / St Pancras about 100m from Eastgate.

The river continues in the culvert along or beside Market Road, eventually exiting the culvert in the garden of Market Walls. It flows under the former Southgate, emerging the other side of South Street, and again bifurcates. Distributaries and tributaries join south of the Chichester bypass and the Lavant outflows to Chichester Harbour past the sewerage works between Fishbourne and Apuldram.

References

Footnotes

Sources

Further reading

 
 

Rivers of West Sussex